Rubus hirsutus, the hirsute raspberry, is a species of flowering plant in the family Rosaceae, native to southern China, Taiwan, the Korean Peninsula, and Japan. It is sister to Rubus chingii.

Subtaxa
The following varieties are accepted:
Rubus hirsutus var. brevipedicellus  – southeast Anhui
Rubus hirsutus var. hirsutus – entire range

References

hirsutus
Flora of South-Central China
Flora of Southeast China
Flora of Taiwan
Flora of Korea
Flora of Japan
Plants described in 1813